Novus is a 27-story mixed-use tower under construction at 400 West Main Street in Downtown Durham, North Carolina. Expected to open in 2024, the building site is the former location of the South Bank building.

References 

Skyscrapers in Durham, North Carolina